Crambus quinquareatus, the large-striped grass-veneer, is a moth in the family Crambidae. It was described by Philipp Christoph Zeller in 1877. It is found in North America, where it has been recorded from Alabama, Florida, Georgia, Louisiana, Maryland, Mississippi, North Carolina, Oklahoma, South Carolina and Texas.

The larvae feed on various grasses.

References

Crambini
Moths described in 1877
Moths of North America